Sophie Rebecca Jelley ( Capitanchik; born 1972) is a British Anglican bishop. Since September 2020, she has been Bishop of Doncaster in the Diocese of Sheffield.

Biography
Jelley was raised in Brighton and studied theology and religious studies at the University of Leeds, before being ordained as a deacon in Bradford Cathedral in 1997.

Previously, she served as Director of Mission, Discipleship and Ministry in the Diocese of Durham and Canon Missioner of Durham Cathedral since 2015. Before joining Durham, she ministered in the Dioceses of Bradford, Guildford and Chichester, and in Uganda with the Church Mission Society.

Episcopal ministry
In December 2019, it was announced that she would be the next Bishop of Doncaster, a suffragan bishop in the Diocese of Sheffield. She was due to be consecrated a bishop on Lady Day 2020 (25 March); but, due to the COVID-19 pandemic, she was instead licensed ad interim as "Bishop of Doncaster designate and Principal Commissary of the Bishop of Sheffield" that day. She was consecrated a bishop during a service on 21 September at York Minster: the principal consecrator was Stephen Cottrell, Archbishop of York, who was assisted by Paul Butler, Bishop of Durham and Pete Wilcox, Bishop of Sheffield.

References

1972 births
Living people
20th-century English Anglican priests
21st-century English Anglican priests
Bishops of Doncaster
Women Anglican bishops
British Anglican missionaries